John Tristram Holland  (31 January 1912 – 9 October 1990) was an Anglican bishop in New Zealand in the 20th century.

Holland was born into an ecclesiastical family, his father being St Barbe Holland, Bishop of Wellington and then Dean of Norwich.

John was educated at Durham School and University College, Oxford. Having trained at Westcott House, Cambridge, he was ordained deacon in 1935 and priest in 1936, he was a curate at St Peter's Huddersfield. Following his father's appointment as Bishop of Wellington in 1936, he then moved to New Zealand and held incumbencies at Featherston, Upper Riccarton and New Plymouth before being appointed the Bishop of Waikato in 1951, a position he held for 18 years. He was consecrated a bishop on 1 May 1951. In 1969 he was translated to the Diocese of Polynesia. He retired in February 1975, and was appointed a Commander of the Order of the British Empire in the 1975 Queen's Birthday Honours.

References

1912 births
People educated at Durham School
Alumni of University College, Oxford
Anglican bishops of Waikato
Anglican bishops of Polynesia
20th-century Anglican bishops in New Zealand
New Zealand Commanders of the Order of the British Empire
1990 deaths
British expatriate bishops